Gabriel Verger (born 30 August 1896, date of death unknown) was a French long-distance runner. He competed in the marathon at the 1924 Summer Olympics.

References

External links
 

1896 births
Year of death unknown
Athletes (track and field) at the 1924 Summer Olympics
French male long-distance runners
French male marathon runners
Olympic athletes of France